The 1987–88 Pittsburgh Penguins season was the Penguins' 21st season in the National Hockey League (NHL). The Penguins improved on their previous season, and finished with a winning record for the first time since the 1978–79 season. Nevertheless, the Penguins once again did not qualify for the playoffs, actually finishing last in a tightly-contested Patrick Division despite earning only seven fewer points than the division champion New York Islanders.

Offseason

Regular season
The Penguins were involved in one of the closest playoff races in NHL history, as they competed down the stretch with the New Jersey Devils and the New York Rangers for the final playoff spot in the Patrick Division. Despite two hefty losses to New Jersey in the last two weeks of the season, the Penguins gave themselves hope with a 7–6 overtime win against the Washington Capitals in their penultimate game of the season. On the last day of the season, the Penguins defeated the Hartford Whalers 4–2 and moved ahead of New York and New Jersey. However, this position was temporary as the Rangers shut out Quebec, 3–0, eliminating the Penguins. The Devils had the last laugh as they beat the Chicago Blackhawks 4–3 in overtime on a goal by John MacLean to claim the fourth and final Patrick Division playoff spot, ahead of both the Rangers and Penguins.

The Penguins finished the regular season 1st in power-play opportunities (500), power-play opportunities against (507), power-play goals against (120) and short-handed goals allowed (19).

Final standings

Schedule and results

|- style="background:#ffc;"
| 1 || Oct 8 || Pittsburgh Penguins || 4–4 OT || New York Rangers || Madison Square Garden (IV) || 0–0–1 || 1
|- style="background:#fcf;"
| 2 || Oct 9 || Pittsburgh Penguins || 3–6 || New Jersey Devils || Izod Center || 0–1–1 || 1
|- style="background:#cfc;"
| 3 || Oct 13 || Buffalo Sabres || 3–8 || Pittsburgh Penguins || Civic Arena || 1–1–1 || 3
|- style="background:#ffc;"
| 4 || Oct 15 || New York Rangers || 6–6 OT || Pittsburgh Penguins || Civic Arena || 1–1–2 || 4
|- style="background:#fcf;"
| 5 || Oct 17 || Pittsburgh Penguins || 2–3 || Montreal Canadiens || Montreal Forum || 1–2–2 || 4
|- style="background:#fcf;"
| 6 || Oct 18 || Pittsburgh Penguins || 2–3 || Philadelphia Flyers || The Spectrum || 1–3–2 || 4
|- style="background:#fcf;"
| 7 || Oct 21 || New Jersey Devils || 5–4 || Pittsburgh Penguins || Civic Arena || 1–4–2 || 4
|- style="background:#fcf;"
| 8 || Oct 23 || Pittsburgh Penguins || 2–5 || Detroit Red Wings || Joe Louis Arena || 1–5–2 || 4
|- style="background:#cfc;"
| 9 || Oct 24 || Buffalo Sabres || 3–5 || Pittsburgh Penguins || Civic Arena || 2–5–2 || 6
|- style="background:#ffc;"
| 10 || Oct 27 || Los Angeles Kings || 4–4 OT || Pittsburgh Penguins || Civic Arena || 2–5–3 || 7
|- style="background:#fcf;"
| 11 || Oct 29 || Toronto Maple Leafs || 4–0 || Pittsburgh Penguins || Civic Arena || 2–6–3 || 7
|- style="background:#cfc;"
| 12 || Oct 31 || Pittsburgh Penguins || 5–4 OT || Quebec Nordiques || Quebec Coliseum || 3–6–3 || 9
|-

|- style="background:#cfc;"
| 13 || Nov 3 || Philadelphia Flyers || 1–5 || Pittsburgh Penguins || Civic Arena || 4–6–3 || 11
|- style="background:#cfc;"
| 14 || Nov 5 || Pittsburgh Penguins || 4–2 || New York Islanders || Nassau Veterans Memorial Coliseum || 5–6–3 || 13
|- style="background:#fcf;"
| 15 || Nov 7 || Pittsburgh Penguins || 1–4 || Boston Bruins || Boston Garden || 5–7–3 || 13
|- style="background:#cfc;"
| 16 || Nov 11 || Washington Capitals || 2–3 || Pittsburgh Penguins || Civic Arena || 6–7–3 || 15
|- style="background:#fcf;"
| 17 || Nov 12 || Pittsburgh Penguins || 2–5 || Philadelphia Flyers || The Spectrum || 6–8–3 || 15
|- style="background:#cfc;"
| 18 || Nov 14 || New York Rangers || 2–3 OT || Pittsburgh Penguins || Civic Arena || 7–8–3 || 17
|- style="background:#fcf;"
| 19 || Nov 17 || Pittsburgh Penguins || 4–6 || Vancouver Canucks || Pacific Coliseum || 7–9–3 || 17
|- style="background:#fcf;"
| 20 || Nov 20 || Pittsburgh Penguins || 1–4 || Edmonton Oilers || Northlands Coliseum || 7–10–3 || 17
|- style="background:#ffc;"
| 21 || Nov 21 || Pittsburgh Penguins || 4–4 OT || Calgary Flames || Scotiabank Saddledome || 7–10–4 || 18
|- style="background:#cfc;"
| 22 || Nov 25 || Quebec Nordiques || 4–6 || Pittsburgh Penguins || Civic Arena || 8–10–4 || 20
|- style="background:#cfc;"
| 23 || Nov 27 || Pittsburgh Penguins || 4–2 || Washington Capitals || Capital Centre || 9–10–4 || 22
|- style="background:#ffc;"
| 24 || Nov 28 || Washington Capitals || 5–5 OT || Pittsburgh Penguins || Civic Arena || 9–10–5 || 23
|-

|- style="background:#fcf;"
| 25 || Dec 2 || New York Islanders || 7–1 || Pittsburgh Penguins || Civic Arena || 9–11–5 || 23
|- style="background:#cfc;"
| 26 || Dec 5 || Vancouver Canucks || 3–6 || Pittsburgh Penguins || Civic Arena || 10–11–5 || 25
|- style="background:#cfc;"
| 27 || Dec 9 || Calgary Flames || 2–5 || Pittsburgh Penguins || Civic Arena || 11–11–5 || 27
|- style="background:#cfc;"
| 28 || Dec 11 || New York Islanders || 4–6 || Pittsburgh Penguins || Civic Arena || 12–11–5 || 29
|- style="background:#fcf;"
| 29 || Dec 12 || Pittsburgh Penguins || 2–5 || St. Louis Blues || The Checkerdome || 12–12–5 || 29
|- style="background:#fcf;"
| 30 || Dec 15 || Philadelphia Flyers || 5–2 || Pittsburgh Penguins || Civic Arena || 12–13–5 || 29
|- style="background:#cfc;"
| 31 || Dec 17 || Pittsburgh Penguins || 7–4 || New Jersey Devils || Izod Center || 13–13–5 || 31
|- style="background:#cfc;"
| 32 || Dec 19 || New York Rangers || 3–4 || Pittsburgh Penguins || Civic Arena || 14–13–5 || 33
|- style="background:#cfc;"
| 33 || Dec 20 || Pittsburgh Penguins || 8–4 || New York Rangers || Madison Square Garden (IV) || 15–13–5 || 35
|- style="background:#fcf;"
| 34 || Dec 23 || New Jersey Devils || 6–2 || Pittsburgh Penguins || Civic Arena || 15–14–5 || 35
|- style="background:#cfc;"
| 35 || Dec 26 || Detroit Red Wings || 3–6 || Pittsburgh Penguins || Civic Arena || 16–14–5 || 37
|- style="background:#ffc;"
| 36 || Dec 27 || Pittsburgh Penguins || 3–3 OT || Buffalo Sabres || Buffalo Memorial Auditorium || 16–14–6 || 38
|- style="background:#ffc;"
| 37 || Dec 29 || Boston Bruins || 4–4 OT || Pittsburgh Penguins || Civic Arena || 16–14–7 || 39
|-

|- style="background:#fcf;"
| 38 || Jan 1 || Pittsburgh Penguins || 3–5 || Washington Capitals || Capital Centre || 16–15–7 || 39
|- style="background:#fcf;"
| 39 || Jan 2 || Pittsburgh Penguins || 2–3 || New York Islanders || Nassau Veterans Memorial Coliseum || 16–16–7 || 39
|- style="background:#ffc;"
| 40 || Jan 5 || Los Angeles Kings || 4–4 OT || Pittsburgh Penguins || Civic Arena || 16–16–8 || 40
|- style="background:#fcf;"
| 41 || Jan 7 || Boston Bruins || 3–2 || Pittsburgh Penguins || Civic Arena || 16–17–8 || 40
|- style="background:#fcf;"
| 42 || Jan 9 || Pittsburgh Penguins || 4–5 OT || Hartford Whalers || XL Center || 16–18–8 || 40
|- style="background:#fcf;"
| 43 || Jan 10 || Pittsburgh Penguins || 5–7 || Detroit Red Wings || Joe Louis Arena || 16–19–8 || 40
|- style="background:#ffc;"
| 44 || Jan 12 || New York Islanders || 5–5 OT || Pittsburgh Penguins || Civic Arena || 16–19–9 || 41
|- style="background:#fcf;"
| 45 || Jan 15 || Philadelphia Flyers || 5–4 || Pittsburgh Penguins || Civic Arena || 16–20–9 || 41
|- style="background:#cfc;"
| 46 || Jan 16 || Pittsburgh Penguins || 4–3 || Toronto Maple Leafs || Maple Leaf Gardens || 17–20–9 || 43
|- style="background:#cfc;"
| 47 || Jan 19 || Pittsburgh Penguins || 6–4 || New York Islanders || Nassau Veterans Memorial Coliseum || 18–20–9 || 45
|- style="background:#cfc;"
| 48 || Jan 20 || Pittsburgh Penguins || 8–3 || Chicago Blackhawks || Chicago Stadium || 19–20–9 || 47
|- style="background:#cfc;"
| 49 || Jan 23 || Pittsburgh Penguins || 4–3 OT || Montreal Canadiens || Montreal Forum || 20–20–9 || 49
|- style="background:#fcf;"
| 50 || Jan 25 || Edmonton Oilers || 6–4 || Pittsburgh Penguins || Civic Arena || 20–21–9 || 49
|- style="background:#fcf;"
| 51 || Jan 27 || Winnipeg Jets || 4–1 || Pittsburgh Penguins || Civic Arena || 20–22–9 || 49
|- style="background:#fcf;"
| 52 || Jan 28 || Pittsburgh Penguins || 3–6 || New Jersey Devils || Izod Center || 20–23–9 || 49
|- style="background:#cfc;"
| 53 || Jan 30 || Chicago Blackhawks || 2–4 || Pittsburgh Penguins || Civic Arena || 21–23–9 || 51
|-

|- style="background:#cfc;"
| 54 || Feb 2 || Washington Capitals || 2–3 OT || Pittsburgh Penguins || Civic Arena || 22–23–9 || 53
|- style="background:#cfc;"
| 55 || Feb 4 || Minnesota North Stars || 0–1 || Pittsburgh Penguins || Civic Arena || 23–23–9 || 55
|- style="background:#cfc;"
| 56 || Feb 6 || Hartford Whalers || 4–5 || Pittsburgh Penguins || Civic Arena || 24–23–9 || 57
|- style="background:#fcf;"
| 57 || Feb 7 || Pittsburgh Penguins || 3–6 || New York Rangers || Madison Square Garden (IV) || 24–24–9 || 57
|- style="background:#cfc;"
| 58 || Feb 13 || Pittsburgh Penguins || 7–5 || Los Angeles Kings || The Forum || 25–24–9 || 59
|- style="background:#fcf;"
| 59 || Feb 17 || Pittsburgh Penguins || 0–5 || Vancouver Canucks || Pacific Coliseum || 25–25–9 || 59
|- style="background:#fcf;"
| 60 || Feb 19 || Pittsburgh Penguins || 3–7 || Edmonton Oilers || Northlands Coliseum || 25–26–9 || 59
|- style="background:#fcf;"
| 61 || Feb 21 || St. Louis Blues || 5–4 || Pittsburgh Penguins || Civic Arena || 25–27–9 || 59
|- style="background:#fcf;"
| 62 || Feb 23 || Winnipeg Jets || 4–3 OT || Pittsburgh Penguins || Civic Arena || 25–28–9 || 59
|- style="background:#fcf;"
| 63 || Feb 25 || Pittsburgh Penguins || 1–2 || New York Rangers || Madison Square Garden (IV) || 25–29–9 || 59
|- style="background:#fcf;"
| 64 || Feb 28 || Pittsburgh Penguins || 5–7 || Chicago Blackhawks || Chicago Stadium || 25–30–9 || 59
|-

|- style="background:#cfc;"
| 65 || Mar 1 || Minnesota North Stars || 3–8 || Pittsburgh Penguins || Civic Arena || 26–30–9 || 61
|- style="background:#cfc;"
| 66 || Mar 5 || New York Islanders || 3–8 || Pittsburgh Penguins || Civic Arena || 27–30–9 || 63
|- style="background:#cfc;"
| 67 || Mar 7 || Pittsburgh Penguins || 5–4 || Calgary Flames || Scotiabank Saddledome || 28–30–9 || 65
|- style="background:#fcf;"
| 68 || Mar 10 || Pittsburgh Penguins || 4–6 || St. Louis Blues || The Checkerdome || 28–31–9 || 65
|- style="background:#fcf;"
| 69 || Mar 12 || Pittsburgh Penguins || 3–6 || Minnesota North Stars || Met Center || 28–32–9 || 65
|- style="background:#cfc;"
| 70 || Mar 13 || Pittsburgh Penguins || 5–4 || Winnipeg Jets || Winnipeg Arena || 29–32–9 || 67
|- style="background:#cfc;"
| 71 || Mar 16 || Toronto Maple Leafs || 2–5 || Pittsburgh Penguins || Civic Arena || 30–32–9 || 69
|- style="background:#cfc;"
| 72 || Mar 19 || Philadelphia Flyers || 0–7 || Pittsburgh Penguins || Civic Arena || 31–32–9 || 71
|- style="background:#fcf;"
| 73 || Mar 20 || Pittsburgh Penguins || 2–4 || Philadelphia Flyers || The Spectrum || 31–33–9 || 71
|- style="background:#cfc;"
| 74 || Mar 23 || Washington Capitals || 1–7 || Pittsburgh Penguins || Civic Arena || 32–33–9 || 73
|- style="background:#cfc;"
| 75 || Mar 25 || Montreal Canadiens || 2–5 || Pittsburgh Penguins || Civic Arena || 33–33–9 || 75
|- style="background:#cfc;"
| 76 || Mar 27 || Pittsburgh Penguins || 6–3 || Quebec Nordiques || Quebec Coliseum || 34–33–9 || 77
|- style="background:#fcf;"
| 77 || Mar 29 || Pittsburgh Penguins || 0–4 || New Jersey Devils || Izod Center || 34–34–9 || 77
|- style="background:#fcf;"
| 78 || Mar 31 || New Jersey Devils || 7–2 || Pittsburgh Penguins || Civic Arena || 34–35–9 || 77
|-

|- style="background:#cfc;"
| 79 || Apr 2 || Pittsburgh Penguins || 7–6 OT || Washington Capitals || Capital Centre || 35–35–9 || 79
|- style="background:#cfc;"
| 80 || Apr 3 || Hartford Whalers || 2–4 || Pittsburgh Penguins || Civic Arena || 36–35–9 || 81
|-

|- style="text-align:center;"
| Legend:       = Win       = Loss       = Tie

Playoffs
The Penguins missed the playoffs for the sixth consecutive year.

Player statistics
Skaters

Goaltenders

†Denotes player spent time with another team before joining the Penguins.  Stats reflect time with the Penguins only.
‡Denotes player was traded mid-season.  Stats reflect time with the Penguins only.

Awards and records
 Mario Lemieux became the first person to score 60 goals in a season for the Penguins. He did so in a 2–4 loss to Philadelphia on March 20th.
 Mario Lemieux became the first person to score 150 points in a season for the Penguins. He did so in a 7–1 win over Washington on March 23rd.
 Mario Lemieux became the first person to score 160 points in a season for the Penguins. He did so in a 6–3 win over Quebec on March 27th.
 Mario Lemieux became the first person to score 70 goals in a season for the Penguins. He did so in a 4–2 win over Hartford on April 3rd.
 Mario Lemieux established a new franchise record for goals (70), assists (98) and points (168) in a season. He held the previous high in all three categories.

Transactions

The Penguins were involved in the following transactions during the 1987–88 season:

Trades

Additions and subtractions

Draft picks

Farm teams

See also
 1987–88 NHL season

References

External links

Pitts
Pitts
Pittsburgh Penguins seasons
Pitts
Pitts